Young Hearts is a compilation album by the Steve Miller Band released in September 2003.

Young Hearts may also refer to:

Film and TV
 Young Hearts (1936 film) (Jonge Harten), Dutch film
 Young Hearts (1944 film) (Junge Herzen), German film
 Young Hearts (1952 film) (Mladé srdcia), Slovak film
 Young Hearts (1953 film) (Ifjú szívvel), Hungarian comedy film
 Malhação, Brazilian soap opera

Music
"Young Hearts" (The Little Heroes song), 1982
"Young Hearts", a song by Four Letter Lie from A New Day
"Young Hearts", a song by Commuter from The Karate Kid
The Young Hearts, or Younghearts, an R&B/soul vocal group from Los Angeles popular in the late 1960s and early '70s.

See also
"Young Hearts Run Free", a 1976 disco song
"Young hearts, be free tonight", first line of Young Turks (song), a 1981 Rod Stewart song sometimes mistakenly known as "Young Hearts"
Young Heart (disambiguation)